Louisa James is an English journalist and newsreader employed by ITV Breakfast, on the Good Morning Britain and Lorraine programmes.

External links

ITV Breakfast presenters and reporters
ITV regional newsreaders and journalists
Living people
Year of birth missing (living people)
Place of birth missing (living people)